The Best of Times is a one-shot television pilot that aired as a "CBS Special Presentation" on August 29, 1983. It was originally going to be a replacement series for Square Pegs, but dismal ratings for the pilot episode caused the network to not go further. The pilot was written by Bob Comfort and Rick Kellard and directed by Bill Bixby.

The show was intended to be an hour-long comedy-drama set in the 1960s, with the characters progressing from high school to college. Comfort complained, "When we first took it to NBC it was in an hour format. But Brandon Tartikoff [NBC's 34-year-old "Child of TV" President of Entertainment] didn't understand it. So then we took it took it to CBS and they immediately saw it as a half-hour comedy; maybe do it with three cameras on tape before a live audience. Then they said how about making it in contemporary times because CBS, at the time, was committed to doing Diner, which was set in the '60s."

Plot
Set in suburban Indiana, the show centers around three friends – smooth Pete Falcone (Robert Romanus), nerdy Neil Hefernan (Leif Green) and aspiring musician Dewey "The Phantom" Hooper (Chris Nash) – starting their freshman year at Ulysses S. Grant High School. Pete has made an agreement with his caring, but strict father Gene (Alex Rocco) that he will stay out of trouble this year, since Gene promised Pete he could have his own car, as Neil is the only one currently with a driver's license. On the way to school, they pick up two girls, brash Robin DuPree (Krista Errickson) and goody-goody Patti Eubanks (Hallie Todd), who takes a liking to Pete immediately. Patti enlists Robin's help to woo Pete at the upcoming freshman dance, as long as Patti pays her money. Dewey also has his hands full when the sadistic, hard-nosed vice principal Franklin T. Otto (William G. Schilling) reminds him that he will keep a close eye on Dewey for the entire semester as he is known for pranks and cutting classes.

A subplot consists of hulking resident bully Garth Stimlovich (Tony Longo) returning to town to settle a score with Pete when he ratted him out in a school incident, causing him to get expelled and placed in military school. He also knows Pete has been taunting Garth's younger brother, as well. One night, as Gene is fixing the sink in the kitchen, he mistakenly receives a threatening phone call from Garth, complete with racial slurs, saying a fight is going to happen. Knowing Pete is a part of this, Gene firmly tells him that even though he does not condone fighting of any kind, and that they have a deal going on, Pete has his permission to teach Garth a lesson, even if it might get Pete suspended from school. He also tells Pete that he will not tell his mother, Peggy, about it, either.

The night of the dance, the three hatch up a plan to get even with Garth's brother and his crony. Neil stands guard outside in the parking lot while Pete and Dewey act casual in the gymnasium. The two bullies corner Neil and he attempts to spray them with a hose, but discovers it is out of water. Pete and Dewey come to his rescue and push both bullies into a car trunk and lock it, but Garth shows up, in his military school uniform, and gives Pete a black eye, but Patti, hiding on the flatbed of a pickup truck, knocks Garth out cold with a trash can lid. To pay her back, Patti tells Pete to look her up in the phone book. The next morning, at breakfast, Peggy is infuriated about the fight and Pete's black eye and refuses to even talk about it. Pete is also confused about the advice Gene has given him and questions what kind of figure Gene is, his father or best friend, When Pete asks him who he is today, Gene briskly, but warmly, replies that he is his father.

Cast
Robert Romanus as Pete Falcone, a student
Krista Errickson as Robin DuPree, a student
Hallie Todd as Patti Eubanks, a student
Chris Nash as Dewey Hooper, a student
Leif Green as Neil Hefernan, a student
Alex Rocco as Gene Falcone, Pete's father
Arlene Golonka as Peggy Falcone, Pete's mother
Rosanna Locke as Theresa Falcone, Pete's sister

Production
The pilot was filmed in April 1983. The show's original working title was Changing Times. Robert Romanus and Hallie Todd also appeared together in Fast Times at Ridgemont High, though they did not share any scenes together.

Reception
The New York Times said that the pilot was "not bad", but says that it's hindered by trying to imitate the popular 1982 comedy-drama Diner: "It is supposed to be about the funny goings-on among the students at good old Grant High, but other elements — slices of life, pieces of drama — keep intruding."

The Manhattan, Kansas Mercury called the pilot "one of those forgettable shows that really has little to offer."

References

External links 

1983 American television series debuts
1983 American television series endings
CBS original programming
American television series premieres
Television pilots not picked up as a series
Television series by Lorimar Television